Roletto is a comune (municipality) of the Metropolitan City of Turin in the Italian region Piedmont, located about  southwest of Turin.

Roletto borders the following municipalities: Pinerolo, Frossasco, and Cantalupa.

Demographic evolution

References

Cities and towns in Piedmont